Above and Beyond: The Encyclopedia of Aviation and Space Sciences was the first-ever attempt at creating an encyclopedia of all matters related to the history, technology and aims of the aerospace industry as it existed in the late 1960s. Published in 1967 by New Horizons Publishers, Inc., of Chicago, this fourteen-volume collection was aimed primarily at teens and young adults.

Encyclopedias of science
Children's encyclopedias
Aerospace
American encyclopedias
1967 non-fiction books